Hermiston-McCauley Mine is a large abandoned underground gold mine in Strathy Township of Temagami, Northeastern Ontario, Canada. It is located between the southwestern arm of Net Lake and the south arm of Kanichee Lake.

History
Hermiston-McCauley was the subject of quartz reef mining. From 1936 to 1938, a  three compartment mine shaft was created. Three levels were created, two of which had  of lateral work.

Geology
Hermiston-McCauley Mine is on the northwestern side of the Net Lake-Vermilion Lake Deformation Zone. This is a northeast–southwest trending high strain zone that separates rocks of the Older and Younger volcanic complexes, which in turn comprise the Temagami Greenstone Belt.

A main and subsidiary quartz-rich zone occur in a ruptured diorite intrusion, which intrudes felsic volcanic rocks in a northwesterly direction with the strike of the Net Lake-Vermilion Lake Deformation Zone. Pyrite with chalcopyrite and gold occupies quartz veins as blebs and small veins.

See also
List of mines in Temagami

References

Mines in Temagami
Strathy Township
Gold mines in Ontario
Underground mines in Canada